Huitzilan de Serdán Municipality is a municipality in Puebla in south-eastern Mexico.

Mayor Manuel Hernández Pasión was murdered on October 10, 2017. His wife and a security guard were also killed.

References

Municipalities of Puebla